The Canton of Auzances is a canton situated in the Creuse département and in the Nouvelle-Aquitaine region of central France.

Geography 
A farming and woodland area, with the town of Auzances, in the arrondissement of Aubusson, at its centre. The altitude varies from 390m (Charron) to 776m (Chard) with an average altitude of 603m.

Composition 
At the French canton reorganisation which came into effect in March 2015, the canton was expanded from 12 to 35 communes:
 
Auzances
Basville
Beissat
Brousse
Bussière-Nouvelle
Chard
Charron
Châtelard
Clairavaux
Le Compas
La Courtine
Crocq
Dontreix
Flayat
Lioux-les-Monges
Magnat-l'Étrange
Malleret
Les Mars
Le Mas-d'Artige
La Mazière-aux-Bons-Hommes
Mérinchal
Pontcharraud
Rougnat
Saint-Agnant-près-Crocq
Saint-Bard
Saint-Georges-Nigremont
Saint-Martial-le-Vieux
Saint-Maurice-près-Crocq
Saint-Merd-la-Breuille
Saint-Oradoux-de-Chirouze
Saint-Oradoux-près-Crocq
Saint-Pardoux-d'Arnet
Sermur  
La Villeneuve
La Villetelle

Population

See also 
 Creuse
 Arrondissements of the Creuse department
 Cantons of the Creuse department
 Communes of the Creuse department

References

Auzances